Coregonus fera, commonly called the true fera, is a presumed extinct freshwater fish from Lake Geneva in Switzerland and France.

Description
 
The fera is a species of freshwater whitefish that reached a length between 35 and 40 centimetres. It is a member of the common whitefish complex (Coregonus lavaretus sensu lato).

The identity of the fera is disputed. In 1950 Emile Dottrens described Coregonus fera as native to both Lake Geneva and Lake Constance. The coregonines from Lake Constance were named Sandfelchen. In 1997 Maurice Kottelat made a revision and used the name Coregonus fera for the Geneva fera and Coregonus arenicolus for theSandfelchen. The common name fera is still also used for fish that continue to live in Lake Geneva, but it now refers to the introduced Coregonus palaea.

Biology
The true fera was a benthopelagic freshwater fish that swam in the water column near the lake bottom, feeding upon zooplankton.  Spawning occurred from February to mid-March.

Extinction
Together with the similarly extinct gravenche (Coregonus hiemalis), the fera was one of the most caught freshwater fishes in Lake Geneva. In 1890 these two fishes constituted 68% of the total captures in the lake. Due to a combination of overexploitation and heavy hybridisation with introduced Coregonus species, it became extremely scarce and was last seen in Lake Geneva in 1920.

References

 Maurice Kottelat: European Freshwater Fishes.  An heuristic checklist of the freshwater fishes of Europe (exclusive of former USSR), with an introduction for non-systematists and comments on nomenclature and conservation; Biologia: Section Zoology vol. 52/5, Slovak Academic Press, Bratislava 1997,

External links
Catalog of Fishes Corregonus fera 

fera
Taxa named by Louis Jurine
Fish described in 1825
Freshwater fish of Europe
Lake fish
Lake Geneva
Extinct animals of Europe
Fish extinctions since 1500